Tanutchai Wijitwongthong (also known as Mond, born 25 January 1997) is a Thai actor. He is known for his main roles as Por in GMMTV's Fabulous 30: The Series (2017), Matt in Kiss Me Again (2018) and Badz in Boy For Rent GMMTV's 2019.

Early life and education 
Tanutchai was born in Bangkok, Thailand to a Thai-Chinese father and a Thai-Indian mother. He is the third child among his siblings, one of which is Chalida Vijitvongthong (Mint), an actress and model. He completed his elementary education at Maepra Fatima School. He started his lower secondary education at Sri Ayudhya School but later transferred to Srinakharinwirot University where he graduated. He was sent by his family to study in India but encountered some problems and had to return to Thailand where he took up and passed the General Educational Development (GED) examination, an equivalent of completing the secondary education level.

In 2019, he graduated with a bachelor's degree in communication arts at Bangkok University.

Filmography

Television

References

External links 
 
 
 

1997 births
Living people
Tanutchai Wijitwongthong
Tanutchai Wijitwongthong
Tanutchai Wijitwongthong
Tanutchai Wijitwongthong
Tanutchai Wijitwongthong